Blepephaeus ocellatus is a species of beetle in the family Cerambycidae. It was described by Charles Joseph Gahan in 1888. It is known from Myanmar, Bhutan, Laos, China, Malaysia, India, Nepal, and Vietnam.

References

Blepephaeus
Beetles described in 1888